James Edward Barton (June 12, 1934 – June 24, 2013) was an American Football League (AFL) center. He played college football at Marshall University.  He then played professionally in the AFL for the Dallas Texans (1960) and the Denver Broncos (1961–1962).

See also
 List of American Football League players

References

1934 births
2013 deaths
American football centers
Dallas Texans (AFL) players
Denver Broncos (AFL) players
Marshall Thundering Herd football players
People from Washington County, Pennsylvania
Players of American football from Pennsylvania